Senator Salling may refer to:

Johnny Ray Salling (born 1961), Maryland State Senate
Lehua Fernandes Salling (born 1949), Hawaii State Senate